Ruka (Kaitag and Dargwa: Рукьа) is a rural locality (a selo) in Dzhavgatsky Selsoviet, Kaytagsky District, Republic of Dagestan, Russia. The population was 961 as of 2010. There are 4 streets.

Geography 
Ruka is located 23 km southeast of Madzhalis (the district's administrative centre) by road. Dzhavgat and Dzhibakhni are the nearest rural localities.

Nationalities 
Dargins live there.

References 

Rural localities in Kaytagsky District